Gounou Gaya is a town in Chad.  It is the capital of the Kabbia department in Mayo-Kebbi Est Region, and is served by an airport.

Gounou Gaya is the birthplace of rebel Abdel Kader Baba-Laddé and of former prime minister Nassour Guelendouksia Ouaido.

References

Populated places in Chad
Mayo-Kebbi Est Region